Kids' Writes was a children's program on Nickelodeon, running from 1981 to 1987. The main cast included Jim Mairs (who also acted as director/guitarist/vocalist), Wynn White, Carlo Grossman, John Rousseau, and Steve Rifkin. The cast (minus Mairs) wore similarly styled jumpsuits, each a different color.

The premise of the show was that children would compose short stories and mail them to the actors (collectively known as the Magic Carpet Band). The best stories were then acted out on camera before a live audience (in a similar vein to Whose Line Is It Anyway?) on a unique set consisting of wooden ramps, steps, metal hoops, nets, and overhangs. Before each story or song, its title was shown, along with the author's name and hometown.

17 episodes of Kids' Writes were produced from 1981 to 1983. During this period, the closing of each show included a voiceover from Mairs, requesting unique and original stories be contributed by the viewers. The request was removed when Kids' Writes ceased production in 1983; reruns were aired on Nickelodeon until 1987.
 
Stories portrayed on Kids' Writes would often involve typical child fantasies such as space flight, monsters, and children becoming heroes to "save the day". Several stories featured devices known as "tickling boots", no doubt reflecting the pleasure young children associate with the act of being tickled. Some submissions became songs where Jim Mairs and Steve Rifkin wrote the music, mostly performed by Jim on guitar or piano.

Each episode opened with Mairs asking one of the children in the studio audience what kind of animal they would like to see the cast make; the other actors would then form a singular one of that animal, while Mairs provided piano accompaniment, usually in a humorous fashion (or occasionally joined the other actors in their performance). Also, midway through each episode was the "Short Stories" segment, in which Mairs would again provide the music while each of the other four actors performed a different viewer's story.

References

External links 
 
The Nick Nostalgia Site

1981 American television series debuts
1983 American television series endings
1980s American children's television series
1980s Nickelodeon original programming
American children's education television series
Television series about children